Dušan Lajović was the defending champion but chose not to defend his title.

Pedro Martínez won the title after defeating Corentin Moutet 7–6(7–5), 6–4 in the final.

Seeds

Draw

Finals

Top half

Bottom half

References
Main Draw
Qualifying Draw

Båstad Challenger - Singles
2018 Singles
Bast